Gymnelia ducei is a moth of the subfamily Arctiinae. It was described by Schaus in 1924. It is found in Colombia.

References

 Natural History Museum Lepidoptera generic names catalog

Gymnelia
Moths described in 1924